The Nantes Congress was the sixth national congress of the French Socialist Party (Parti socialiste or PS). It took place from 17 to 18 June 1977, directly after the left's victory in the local elections.

At the Congress, the more moderate François Mitterrand comprehensively defeated the left wing challenger Jean-Pierre Chevènement.

Results

François Mitterrand was re-elected as First Secretary.

References

Congresses of the Socialist Party (France)
1977 in France
1977 in politics
1977 conferences